Cellaria is a genus of bryozoans belonging to the family Cellariidae.

The genus has cosmopolitan distribution.

Species

Species:

Cellaria adamantina 
Cellaria anceps 
Cellaria atlantida

References

Bryozoan genera